Plankton, Aerosol, Cloud, ocean Ecosystem (PACE) is a NASA Earth-observing satellite mission that will continue and advance observations of global ocean color, biogeochemistry, and ecology, as well as the carbon cycle, aerosols and clouds. PACE will be used to identify the extent and duration of phytoplankton blooms and improve understanding of air quality. These and other uses of PACE data will benefit the economy and society, especially sectors that rely on water quality, fisheries and food security.

The mission is currently in construction, after being proposed for cancellation under President's Trump FY 2018 budget but restored by Congress. The PACE project is managed by NASA Goddard Space Flight Center. The main instrument and bus are being designed and built at Goddard Space Flight Center.

On 4 February 2020, NASA announced the selection of SpaceX to launch PACE on a Falcon 9, at a total cost to NASA of US$80.4 million, including the launch service and other mission-related costs. The PACE mission has a cost cap of US$805 million. As of May 2022, PACE is scheduled to launch in January 2024.

History 
PACE was called Pre-Aerosol, Cloud, and ocean Ecosystem (PACE). PACE was approved to move forward out of its preliminary stage of planning on 16 June 2016 at the Key Decision Point-A (KDP-A) event. A significant milestone for this next stage is that the official mission budget becomes available for use on 1 July 2016, project manager Andre Dress said.

Science overview 
PACE has two fundamental science goals: "to extend key systematic ocean color, aerosol, and cloud data records for Earth system and climate studies, and to address new and emerging science questions using its advanced instruments, surpassing the capabilities of previous and current missions". The ocean and atmosphere are directly connected, moving and transferring energy, water, nutrients, gases, aerosols, and pollutants. Aerosols, clouds, and phytoplankton can also affect one another.

PACE will measure atmospheric particles and clouds that scatter and absorb sunlight. Improved characterization of aerosol particles will enable quantifying their impact on marine biology and ocean chemistry, as well as Earth's energy budget and ecological forecasting. PACE will enable scientists to better monitor fisheries, identify harmful algal blooms, and observe changes in marine resources. The color of the ocean is determined by the interaction of sunlight with substances or particles present in seawater such as chlorophyll, a green pigment found in most phytoplankton species. By monitoring global phytoplankton distribution and abundance, the mission will contribute toward understanding the complex systems that drive ocean ecology.

Scientific instruments 
The oceans play a critical role in supporting life on Earth as well as the global economy. To understand changes in ocean health related to climate change; formulation of science objectives and sensor requirements for an advanced ocean biology satellite mission began in the year 2000 with a NASA agency-wide carbon cycle initiative that included ocean, terrestrial, and atmospheric disciplines.

The instrument requirements for this ocean ecology mission are:

 Ocean Color Instrument (OCI), primary sensor, is a highly advanced optical spectrometer that will be used to measure properties of light over portions of the electromagnetic spectrum. It will enable continuous measurement of light at finer wavelength resolution than previous NASA satellite sensors, extending key system ocean color data records for climate studies. It is capable of measuring the color of the ocean from ultraviolet to shortwave infrared. Wavelengths UV (350-400 nm), visible (400-700 nm), and near-infrared (700-885 nm), as well as several shortwave infrared bands.

 Spectro-Polarimeter for Planetary Exploration (SPEXone) is a multi-angle polarimeter that provides continuous wavelengths coverage in the range 385-770 nm. It measures the intensity, Degree of Linear Polarization (DoLP) and Angle of Linear Polarization (AoLP) of sunlight reflected back from Earth's atmosphere, land surface, and ocean. The focus of the SPEXone development is to achieve a very high accuracy of DoLP measurements, which facilitates accurate characterization of aerosols in the atmosphere. It observes a ground pixel under 5 viewing angles (0°, ±20° and ±58° on ground), where the ±20° viewports will be used for cross calibration with OCI. Aerosols are small solid or liquid particles suspended in the air that affect climate directly through interaction with solar radiation. Aerosols affect climate indirectly by changing the micro- and macro-physical properties of clouds. According to the Intergovernmental Panel on Climate Change, aerosols are the largest source of error in quantifying the radiative forcing of climate change. SPEXone will enable measurements of optical and micro-physical properties of aerosols with unprecedented detail and accuracy.

 Hyper-Angular Rainbow Polarimeter #2 (HARP2) is a wide angle imaging polarimeter designed to measure aerosol particles and clouds, as well as properties of land and water surfaces. The amount and type of particles in suspension in the atmosphere are relevant to applications pertaining to health effects, cloud life cycle and precipitation, climate, etc. HARP2 will combine data from multiple along track viewing angles (up to 60), four spectral bands in the visible and near infrared ranges, and three angles of linear polarization to measure the microphysical properties of the atmospheric particles including their size distribution, amount, refractive indices and particle shape. HARP2 will be designed and built by University of Maryland, Baltimore County (UMBC)'s Earth and Space Institute. The HARP2 instrument was preceded by HARP  (HyperAngular Rainbow Polarimeter), a NASA cubesat launched to ISS on Nov 2nd, 2019, deployed from ISS on Feb 19th, 2020, achieved first light April 15th, 2020 and decayed from orbit Apr 4, 2022. COSPAR 1998-067QZ, SATCAT 45256.

See also 

 NASA Earth Science
 Earth Observing System

References

External links 
 PACE mission home page
 NASA Ocean Color

Earth observation satellites of the United States
NASA satellites
2024 in spaceflight